The National Movement fraction was the parliamentary group of the National Front in the Iranian Parliament. From 1950 to 1952, it was named the 'National Caucus'.

Historical membership

References 

Iranian Parliament fractions
1950 establishments in Iran